Guto Pryderi Puw (born 1971) is a Welsh composer, university lecturer and conductor.  He is considered to be one of the most prominent Welsh composers of his generation and a key figure in current Welsh music. Puw's music has been broadcast on BBC Radio 3 and been featured on television programmes for the BBC and S4C. He has twice been awarded the Composer's Medal at the National Eisteddfod.

Puw's works include pieces for unusual combinations of instruments, such as a tuba quartet or a trio consisting of harp, cello and double-bass, as well as more traditional forces such as solo baritone and piano, choir or orchestra. He was associated with the BBC National Orchestra of Wales as its Resident Composer, the first holder of this title, from 2006 to 2010. Puw's own Welsh identity is a recurrent theme in his music: some of his pieces set Welsh-language poetry to music and one of his pieces, Reservoirs, is written about the flooding of Welsh valleys to provide water for England.

Biography
Born in Parc (a village in Gwynedd near Bala), Puw studied music composition at Bangor University with John Pickard, Andrew Lewis and Pwyll ap Siôn. Puw was awarded with a MMus degree in 1996 and a PhD degree in 2002. He was then awarded an Arts Council of Wales bursary and studied with the composer John Metcalf. Puw was appointed as a Lecturer in Music at Bangor University in 2006, having previously been a Teaching Fellow in Music from 2004. A Welsh speaker, he has been the Welsh Medium Teaching Fellow for the School of Music.

Puw has received commissions from (amongst others) BBC Radio 3, the Welsh baritone Jeremy Huw Williams, the Bangor New Music Festival and the North Wales International Music Festival. He was appointed the first Resident Composer with BBC National Orchestra of Wales (BBC NOW) in 2006 and held this position until 2010. During this time, Puw wrote a concerto for oboe (premiered in 2006) and an orchestral piece, ... onyt agoraf y drws ..., which was first performed to critical acclaim at the 2007 Proms.

He has been active in the promotion of new music in north Wales through his involvement with the Bangor Music Festival, being its Artistic Director and founding member since 2000. In 2014 he received the Sir Geraint Evans Award by the Welsh Music Guild for his ‘significant contribution to Welsh music.’

Music

Welsh links
Puw's music is rooted in the language and literature of Wales, with a particular affinity to the poetry of R. S. Thomas. Welsh titles and settings of poetry in Welsh, such as Mecanwaith, Dawns y Sêr, and ... onyt agoraf y drws ..., feature in his work. He has won the Composer's Medal at the National Eisteddfod of Wales twice, winning it first in 1995 for a harp piece, Ffantasia II. In 1997, when the Eisteddfod was held in Bala, he won the Medal for a string quartet,  ("Mechanism") – this piece was later featured in S4C's television series  ("The Composers").  has also been performed by the Duke Quartet at the 1998 Bath International Music Festival and the 1999 Huddersfield Contemporary Music Festival.

Orchestral works
It takes its inspiration from different qualities of the human voice, including stutters and chatterboxes. Puw has said that "The second movement is inspired by talkative people who won't let you contribute to a conversation", represented by a repeated row of 13 notes played until "it gets rather unbearable". It was broadcast on BBC Radio 3 on 1 March 2007 as part of a programme of music by Welsh composers to celebrate St David's Day. The concerto won Puw the 2007 BBC Radio 3 Listeners Award at the British Composer Awards.

His orchestral piece Reservoirs was inspired by a 1968 poem by R. S. Thomas about the drowning of Welsh valleys such as Tryweryn (a few miles from where Puw grew up) and Clywedog to provide water for England. Puw had a particular affinity with the topic as his grandfather lost farmland in the Tryweryn flooding. Nevertheless, he has said that he "decided not to take the poem too literally because as a composer you can be subject to criticism for doing that." It was nominated in 2005 in the Large-Scale Composition category of the Royal Philharmonic Society Music Awards. The music was used in a BBC2 Wales documentary, "Drowning a Village", broadcast on 9 March 2006. A performance by BBC NOW was broadcast on BBC Radio 3 as part of the 2005 Vale of Glamorgan Festival.

As part of his association with BBC NOW, Puw was commissioned by BBC Radio 3 to compose for the 2007 Proms.  His orchestral piece,  ("... unless I open the door ...") was premiered on 9 August 2007, conducted by David Atherton. It is based on a story from the Mabinogion, a collection of medieval Welsh tales, in which a group of warriors, lately returned from Ireland, feast in Harlech for seven years with the severed head of their leader at the head of the table.  They then feast in Penfro for eighty years in a hall with three doors, and only remember the dreadful events that happened in Ireland when the third door opens.  Each of the three doors in Penfro was represented by an instrument in a box in the Royal Albert Hall.

In recent years, each movement of his lyrical Violin Concerto - Soft Stillness (2012–14) uses quotations from the 5th Act of Shakespeare's The Merchant of Venice as inspiration. The orchestral work Camouflage (2017–18) is constructed from different layers of textures created by various instrumental combinations. The repeated two-note motif introduced at the beginning and later the ascending scales are gradually concealed within thick blocks of orchestral textures. Often these blocks have been constructed from layers of identical ideas that are repeated within a passage, similar to a pattern found in a typical camouflage.

Opera and music theatre
 In 2009 Hadau was commissioned by the National Eisteddfod of Wales to be performed alongside an installation by artist Christine Mills at the Lle Celf pavilion. Scored for soprano, harp and narrator, the work was inspired by the strong Cerdd Dant tradition particularly found in rural communities of Meirionnydd and other parts of the country.

Earlier in 2017 Puw completed his first chamber opera Y Tŵr based on the play by the Welsh playwright, Gwenlyn Parry and to libretto by Gwyneth Glyn. It was premiered by Music Theatre Wales and Richard Baker on 18 May 2017 at the Sherman Theatre, Cardiff during the Vale of Glamorgan Festival. The opera in three acts explores the relationship and emotions between two characters during three specific periods in their lives, during youth, middle age and finally, old age. The composer's use of atonal musical language, octatonic scales and the occasional tonal passage are directly linked with the various emotions of the characters and the unfolding of the drama.

Other works
Unusual instrumentation and unusual performance techniques, including elements of improvisation, are also important features of his work. In 1998 he composed X-ist, a piece for IST (the Improvising String Trio, consisting of harp, cello and double-bass).  It was described by reviewers as a "frighteningly frantic" and "challenging" piece.  X-ist uses a graphic score and includes written directions to the players that act as "creative stimuli", containing notes and motifs to be followed. The piece also requires the cellist and double-bassist to tap their instruments, as well as use normal playing methods. Another piece requiring improvisation by performers was his commission for the 2001 Bangor New Music Festival, which was written for ensemble (saxophone, guitar, harp, keyboard, cello, piano) and optional dancer.  In his performing notes, Puw describes the pieces as a "stimulus for musical improvisation" in which any notes, normal or extended musical techniques and/or percussive effects may be applied.  has two contrasting sub-sections, a and b, arranged in the form a-b-a-a-a-b-a-b to match the Welsh poetic measure of the same name, with the strings playing calmly in the "a" sections, and saxophone and keyboard (gradually joined by the other instruments) playing in a more lively manner in the "b" sections. The musicians and the dancer are required to react to each other's contributions in each section to create a "multi-media" experience.

Visages, his 1999 piece for 2 tubas and 2 euphoniums, was described as "astringent, often whimsical but well written for these instruments". Puw said that in the piece "Freedom is granted to the performers to make any subtle facial expressions that add to the musical interpretation". Puw describes  (a piece for solo piano, composed for the 2000 Bangor New Music Festival) as an "intimate reflection" upon the music of, and a tribute to, Robert Schumann, his "intricate compositional style" and "world of delicate expression". The music becomes "simpler and softer" throughout the piece, moving from the "rhythmic complexity" of the opening bars through to slow quavers transforming into triplets. An ensemble piece, different light (for clarinet, violin, cello and piano) was "inspired by the idea of moving a picture from one place to another, be it to another house, or from one room to the next, or even from one wall to another." As the picture is moved, it looks the same but is perceived in a different light. Puw attempts to convey this in musical terms by having each instrument enter separately with its own musical phrase in the first part of the piece. Then, in the second part of the piece, all the thematic material is repeated with the instruments playing simultaneously, so that the music is similarly perceived in a different light. different light was featured at the 2001 UKwithNY festival at the Angel Orensanz Center in New York City. His 2005 composition for the Bangor New Music Festival, Stereo Type, was written for amplified typewriters and tape.  It was premiered by School of Music students from Bangor University in the Deiniol Shopping Centre, Bangor, on 5 March 2005.

In 2017 he composed Sustained Clusters (March) for brass quintet and fairground organ, which was first performed by Onyx Brass at the Eastern Shelter, Barry during the Vale of Glamorgan Festival. The work features a series of chordal clusters, repeated descending modal scales and a playful tune, creating a humorous dialogue between the brass ensemble and the fairground organ. His latest piece for street organ was Ffantasia V and was premiere at the Vale of Glamorgan Festival in May 2019.

List of compositions
A list of Puw's major compositions.

Awards and nominations
2005 – Reservoirs (orchestral) nominated in the Large-Scale Composition category of the Royal Philharmonic Society Music Awards
2007 – Winner of the BBC Radio 3 Listeners Award at the British Composer Awards for his Oboe Concerto
2013 – Sir Geraint Evans Award presented by the Welsh Music Guild "for his significant contribution to Welsh music"
2015 –  '…onyt agoraf y drws…'  was chosen as the 2nd finest orchestral work by a Welsh composer, Gramophone magazine

Recordings
Reservoirs – Orchestral Works by Guto Pryderi Puw, Signum Records (May 2014). Tracks includes ...onyt agoraf y drws..., Concerto for Oboe, Reservoirs, Hologram and 'Break the Stone' Overture.
Violin Concerto – Soft Stillness, included on the CD Violin Muse performed by violinist Madeleine Mitchell and the BBC National Orchestra of Wales/Edwin Outwater, Divine Art (October 2017).
Visages, included on the CD Earth and Moon performed by Tubalaté.

References

External links
A page from the score of 
A page from the score of 
R. S. Thomas's poem 'Reservoirs', which inspired Puw's orchestral work of the same name

20th-century classical composers
21st-century classical composers
Welsh classical composers
Welsh male classical composers
Academics of Bangor University
Alumni of Bangor University
1971 births
Living people
20th-century British composers
20th-century British male musicians
20th-century British musicians
21st-century British male musicians
21st-century British composers